Scientists from Cornell University played a major role in developing the technology that resulted in the first atomic bombs used in World War II.  In turn, Cornell Physics professor Hans Bethe used the project as an opportunity to recruit young scientists to join the Cornell faculty after the war. The following people worked on the Manhattan Project primarily in Los Alamos, New Mexico during World War II and either studied or taught at Cornell University before or after the War:
 Robert Fox Bacher – headed the experimental physics division, Cornell Physics professor from 1935 until the War
 Manson Benedict – developed the gaseous diffusion method for separating the isotopes of uranium and supervised the engineering and process development of the K-25 plant in Oak Ridge, Tennessee, where fissionable material for the atomic bomb was produced
 Hans Bethe – director of the theoretical division
 Gertrude Blanch – oversaw calculations for the Manhattan Project
 Oswald C. Brewster – Cornell class of 1918, project engineer who wrote to senior government officials warning about the potential of atomic bombs ending civilization.
 Walter S. Carpenter Jr. – oversaw the DuPont company's involvement in the Manhattan Project
 Frederick J. Clarke – master's degree in civil engineering from Cornell University in 1940
 Dale R. Corson – later became President of Cornell
 John Curtin – Cornell theoretical physics Ph.D class of 1943
 Jean Klein Dayton – helped design detonation systems
 John W. DeWire – Cornell physics faculty
 Richard Davisson – worked in Special Engineer Detachment
 Eleanor & Richard Ehrlich
 Richard Feynman – team leader under Bethe, later taught Physics at Cornell
 Kenneth Greisen – worked on instrumentation, later Cornell Physics faculty
 Lottie Grieff
 William Higinbotham – headed the electronics group
 Marshall Holloway – PhD from Cornell
 Henry Hurwitz Jr. – Cornell class of 1938
 Walter Kauzmann – in charge of producing the detonator for the Trinity test
 Margaret Ramsey Keck
 Giovanni Rossi Lomanitz – worked at the Berkeley Radiation Laboratory; doctorate in theoretical physics from Cornell University, where he was the first graduate student of Richard Feynman.
 Robert Marshak –  PhD from Cornell University in 1939
 Boyce McDaniel – later became director of Cornell's Laboratory of Nuclear Studies
 William T. Miller – developed the chlorofluorocarbon polymer used in the first gaseous diffusion plant for the separation of uranium isotopes, Cornell chemistry faculty, 1936 – 1977
 Elliott Waters Montroll – Head of the Mathematics Research Group at the Kellex Corporation in New York, working on programs associated with the Manhattan Project.
 Philip Morrison –  Cornell physics faculty 1946 – 1964.
 Kenneth Nichols – deputy to General Leslie Groves, ME from Cornell
 Paul Olum – later became President of the University of Oregon
 Lyman G. Parrett – Cornell physics faculty
 Arthur V. Peterson – Manhattan District's Chicago Area Engineer, responsible for the Metallurgical Laboratory
 Edith Hinkley Quimby
 Marcia White Rosenthal
 Bruno Rossi – co-director of the Detector Group, Cornell physics faculty 1942-1946
Harvey L. Slatin –  physicist and inventor who worked on the isolation of plutonium with the Special Engineering Detachment
 LaRoy Thompson – Cornell class of 1942, physically assembled the first bomb and flew the practice bombing run at Bikini Island. Later, senior vice president and treasurer of the University of Rochester
 Robert R. Wilson – head of the Cyclotron Group (R-1)
 William M. Woodward – Cornell physics faculty

References

Cornell University